"What a Difference You've Made in My Life" is an inspirational song written by Archie Jordan and first made famous by two artists during 1977: then-teenage Christian music singer Amy Grant and country music singer Ronnie Milsap.

Song history 
Amy Grant's version was included on her self-titled debut album, which was sold largely in Christian bookstores and outlets. The song was released as a single to Christian-oriented radio stations, charted at No. 5 on the US Christian charts, and helped Grant become well known in what was then a small sub-genre of religious-themed music.

However, Milsap's version became better-known. It was released in November 1977 as the second single from the album It Was Almost Like a Song. The song soon scored the Billboard Hot Country Songs chart and was his ninth No. 1 song on that chart. Milsap re-recorded the song for his 2009 country gospel album, Then Sings My Soul.

In 1978, B. J. Thomas covered the song on his Happy Man album, which became a Top 10 Christian hit.

Chart history

References

External links 
 
 

1978 singles
Amy Grant songs
B. J. Thomas songs
Ronnie Milsap songs
RCA Records singles
Songs written by Archie Jordan
Song recordings produced by Tom Collins (record producer)
1977 songs